is a Japanese retired football player.

Japan U-21
Toma was selected for the Japan Under-21 squad for the 2010 Asian Games held in Guangzhou, China PR.

Club statistics
Updated to 24 February 2019.

References

External links
Profile at Matsumoto Yamaga

1989 births
Living people
Association football people from Okinawa Prefecture
Japanese footballers
J1 League players
J2 League players
Kashima Antlers players
Tochigi SC players
Montedio Yamagata players
Matsumoto Yamaga FC players
FC Gifu players
Asian Games medalists in football
Footballers at the 2010 Asian Games
Medalists at the 2010 Asian Games
Asian Games gold medalists for Japan
Association football defenders